Groundnut crinkle virus (CPMMV) is a pathogenic plant virus. According to the Handbook of Plant Virus Diseases, the pathogen is found in Ivory Coast.

References

External links
Family Groups - The Baltimore Method

Carlaviruses
Viral plant pathogens and diseases